Fall Creek is an unincorporated community in Lane County, Oregon, United States, southeast of Eugene/Springfield. Nearby communities include Dexter to the south, Lowell to the southeast, and Jasper to the northwest.

The locale was named for Fall Creek, a stream originating in Willamette National Forest and flowing into the Middle Fork Willamette River just below the community.  Fall Creek Lake lies upstream on Fall Creek. There is no reservoir on Little Fall Creek.

Fall Creek is in the zip code 97438.

Covered bridges
Lane County has the largest number of covered bridges in Oregon, and several others are within a short distance of Fall Creek.

References
2000 census data

Unincorporated communities in Lane County, Oregon
Unincorporated communities in Oregon